Gibberula miliaria is a species of very small sea snail, a marine gastropod mollusk or micromollusk in the family Cystiscidae.

Description
The shell size varies between 4.5 mm and 7.5 mm

Distribution
This species occurs in European waters (off Spain and Portugal), in the Mediterraneran Sea (offApulia and Greece) and in the Atlantic Ocean off the Canary Islands and Mauritania.

References

 Arnaud, P. M., 1978. Révision des taxa malacologiques méditerrannéens introduits par Antoine Risso. Annales du Muséum d'Histoire Naturelle de Nice "1977"5: 101-150
 Wolff, W.J.; Duiven, P.; Esselink, P.; Gueve, A. (1993). Biomass of macrobenthic tidal flat fauna of the Banc d'Arguin, Mauritania. Hydrobiologia 258(1-3): 151-163
 Gofas S. (1990). Le genre Gibberula (Marginellidae) en Méditerranée. Lavori, Società Italiana di Malacologia 23: 113-139 page(s): 125-127; note: lectotype designated

External links
 
 Linnaeus, C. (1758). Systema Naturae per regna tria naturae, secundum classes, ordines, genera, species, cum characteribus, differentiis, synonymis, locis. Editio decima, reformata [10th revised edition, vol. 1: 824 pp. Laurentius Salvius: Holmiae.]
 Delle Chiaje S. (1823-1831). Memorie sulla storia e notomia degli animali senza vertebre del regno di Napoli. Napoli: Fratelli Fernandes (vol. 1), and Società Tipografica (vol. 2-4). Vol. 1, pp. i-xii, 1-84 [1823, pp. 1-184 [1824]; vol. 2, pp. [1-4] + 185-224 [1825], pp. 225-444 [1826]; vol. 3, pp. i-xx, pp. 1-232 [1828]; vol. 4, pp. i-vii [1831], 1-116 [1830], pp. 117-214 [1831]; pl. 1-4; pl. 1-69]
 Risso, A. (1826-1827). Histoire naturelle des principales productions de l'Europe Méridionale et particulièrement de celles des environs de Nice et des Alpes Maritimes. Paris, Levrault:. . 3(XVI): 1-480, 14 pls
 Lamarck, [J.-B. M. de. (1822). Histoire naturelle des animaux sans vertèbres. Tome septième. Paris: published by the Author, 711 pp.]
 Bucquoy E., Dautzenberg P. & Dollfus G. (1882-1886). Les mollusques marins du Roussillon. Tome Ier. Gastropodes. Paris: Baillière & fils. 570 pp., 66 pls
 Gofas, S.; Le Renard, J.; Bouchet, P. (2001). Mollusca. in: Costello, M.J. et al. (eds), European Register of Marine Species: a check-list of the marine species in Europe and a bibliography of guides to their identification. Patrimoines Naturels. 50: 180-213

miliaria
Cystiscidae
Gastropods described in 1758
Taxa named by Carl Linnaeus